Dalv-e Nazar (also Romanized as Dalv-e Naz̧ar and Dalv Naz̧ar; also known as Dar Nazar) is a village in Qeshlaq Rural District, in the Central District of Khorrambid County, Fars Province, Iran. At the 2006 census, its population was 581, in 130 families.

References 

Populated places in Khorrambid County